Kızılkaya is a town (belde) in the Bucak District, Burdur Province, Turkey. Its population is 3,154 (2021). The town is an old settlement. It was inhabited during the late Hitite era. During the Ottoman Empire era it was a district of Antalya Province to the south. It was declared a seat of township in 1973.

References

Populated places in Burdur Province
Towns in Turkey
Populated places in Bucak District